See also  for two other James Backhouse botanists and nursery owners of York.

James Backhouse (8 July 1794 – 20 January 1869) was a botanist and missionary for the Quaker church in Australia. His son, also James Backhouse (1825–1890), was also a botanist.

Early life in England
James Backhouse was born in 1794, the fourth child of James and Mary Backhouse a Quaker business family of Darlington, County Durham, England. He was the third after his father and grandfather to be called James Backhouse. His grandfather died as a Quaker prisoner and martyr at Lancaster Castle in 1697. His father, James, (together with his father and brother), founded the Backhouse's Bank in Darlington. His mother was Mary Dearman of Thorne, Yorkshire, also a devout Quaker. His father died when he was a child and his mother brought him up in a religious atmosphere. He was educated in Leeds and began work in a grocery, drug and chemical business, but he developed tuberculosis and became too delicate to pursue a sedentary occupation. Coming from a family of botanists, he was encouraged to spend time in the open air and study botany. An uncle helped him in this and he made botanical trips to Upper Teesdale with the Durham lead miner, John Binks (1766–1817) who is credited with the discovery of many of the area's rare plants. Binks was a major influence, as was the Newcastle botanist, Nathaniel John Winch, and William Jackson Hooker (1785–1865). James then spent two years as an apprentice at Wagstaffe's nursery in Tivetshall, near Norwich, and where he first conceived of 'a gospel errand into Australia' believing strongly that this was the will of God. The nursery was an enterprise run by Quakers; Thomas Wagstaffe was the clerk of the Tivetshall Monthly Meeting and a prominent benefactor to the Society of Friends in Norfolk.

In 1815 Backhouse moved to York, where he and his brother Thomas purchased the York nursery business of John and George Telford in Toft Green, which had been in existence for 150 years. By 1821 the business was flourishing with 37 varieties of vines, 31 of strawberries, 170 gooseberries, 129 roses and 125 apple trees. 

In 1822 Backhouse married Deborah Lowe, and in 1824 he was admitted as a minister in the Religious Society of Friends. As a dedicated Quaker and clerk of York monthly meeting from 1825, he travelled in the ministry from that year. His commitment and evangelising were central to his life. He addressed a crowd at York racecourse, which his sister Sarah put at two thousand, on 'the iniquity of the frivolities in which they were engaged, and to call their attention to the weightier concerns of eternity' (York Courant, 9 August 1825). 

In December 1827, the wives of both brothers died, James being left with a son and a daughter.

Australia
In September 1831, Backhouse sailed for Australia on a mission to the convicts and settlers. In this venture he had the support of the monthly meeting and of his brother, Thomas, also a devout Quaker, who believed evangelising took precedence over business, and who therefore looked after the business on his behalf. 

The initial journey took five months. His Quaker ministry, assisted by his companion and secretary, George Washington Walker (1800–1859), began immediately with the crew which was prone to drunkenness and violence. The missionaries arrived at Hobart in February 1832, and they spent the next six years journeying all over the then settled districts of Tasmania, New South Wales, and as far north as the site of Brisbane. They visited Port Phillip in 1837, and the states of South Australia and Western Australia just before they left.

They visited penal settlements working for and interceding for prisoners, and deeply concerned by the cruelty and rigours they found. They wrote to Elizabeth Fry about the condition of women prisoners on ships and to the Governor of Van Diemen's Land on the prisons. Death of prisoners was often by murder from other prisoners in appalling conditions. Backhouse and Walker issued a lengthy address to the prison population of New South Wales and Van Diemen's Land pleading for prisoners to find salvation in religion. They were tireless campaigners for temperance and thrift. A third of wages paid in spirits was mentioned at a temperance meeting in Perth and they felt 'the prevailing immorality' was fuelled by drink. They also looked at the policy towards Aborigines 'this injured race of our fellow men'. Alongside their work with prisons they set up and visited Quaker meeting houses.

South Africa
Backhouse and Walker then went to Mauritius and South Africa and continued their missionary work, preaching whenever a few people could be gathered together to hear them. In South Africa they also visited prisons including Robben Island and in more than 19 months and 6000 miles on wagon and horseback he learnt languages including Afrikaans so he could speak to the local populations, attended Quaker meetings, temperance meetings and non-Quaker meetings, and set up a multi-racial school for the poor in Cape Town with money sent by English Friends. 

On his travels, James Backhouse also collected plants and seeds which he sent back to the York nursery, to Kew Gardens, and to Professor William Hooker, Professor of Botany at Glasgow. His works published on his return, "A narrative visit to the Australian colonies" (1843) and "A narrative visit to the Mauritius and South Africa" (1844) are detailed accounts of his travels with engravings from his original sketches of indigenous vegetation, aborigines, chain gangs of prisoners, and numerous missionary stations, with appendices of letters sent to officials, Christian evangelical writings and speeches.

England
Backhouse returned to England and arrived at London on 15 February 1841. In York, his safe return was greeted fervently by the York Quarterly and Monthly Meetings. The nursery had flourished in his absence but with the coming of the railway had had to move from Toft Green to Fishergate. When his brother died in 1845, he brought his own son James into the business, and with him supervised the move in 1853 to a 100-acre site, greater than Kew, at Holgate. The most striking feature was a rock (alpine) garden, 40 glasshouses, underground fernery and plants from all over the world. 

He maintained detailed involvement in the family finance, in wills and in the business but he also continued his evangelical work making many visits around the country, including to Dublin. He gave talks to workers at York Glass works in 1858 and also to the rail wagon works. He was involved in Quaker schools at Bootham and Ackworth and gave financial as well as spiritual help for a reading room at a nonconformist chapel in Upper Teesdale. He visited Norway in 1851, 1853 and 1860, holding more than 200 meetings in 1853 and 1860. In 1862 he held over 40 meetings throughout Great Britain and in 1865, aged over 70, there were 53 public meetings at which he exhorted Friends to turn against pomp and parade, the lures of honorific office, elegant or ornamental clothing and using heathen names of days and months.

Backhouse maintained his evangelical work all his life, travelling and preaching much in England, Scotland and Ireland. Among his published works, Backhouse wrote or edited "A memoir of Deborah Backhouse of York" (1828), "Memoirs of Francis Howgill" (1828), "Extracts from the Letters of James Backhouse" (1838–41), "The life and correspondence of William and Alice Ellis" (1849), "A short record of the life and experiences of Thomas Bulman" (1851), and numerous sermons, addresses and tracts. With Charles Tylor he wrote "The life and labours of George Washington Walker" (1862).

James Backhouse was honoured by having the plant genus Backhousia  named after him.

In 2017 a commemorative plaque was unveiled at 92 Micklegate, York, once the home of the Backhouse brothers, and now of the York Conservation Trust. This was the result of a collaboration between the York Civic Trust, The York Conservation Trust, and the Yorkshire Gardens Trust.

Family 
James Backhouse was the third of five consecutive generations named James Backhouse, so they are also often mentioned with generational suffix ordinals:
 His grandfather James Backhouse (1) (1720–1798), who was the founder of Backhouse's Bank;
 His father James Backhouse (2) (1757–1804);
 James Backhouse (3) (1794–1869) himself;
 His son James Backhouse (4) (1825–1890), who was a notable botanist; and
 His grandson James Backhouse (5) (1861–1945), who was the author of A handbook of European birds (1890) and other publications.

After his return from Australia in 1841, James (3) made trips to Norway, to do his missionary work, but also to collect plants, together with his son James (4).

References

External links
 Extracts from the letters of James Backhouse
 Memoir of James Backhouse
 The Backhouse, Holgate
 James Backhouse at York Civic Trust
 York Conservation Trust
 Yorkshire Gardens Trust
 York Stories
 Backhouse nursery
 Backhouse Nursery archives

Quaker missionaries
English Quakers
Australian Quakers
1794 births
1869 deaths
Quaker ministers
Botanists active in Australia
People from Darlington
19th-century Quakers
English Protestant missionaries
Protestant missionaries in Australia
Protestant missionaries in South Africa
Protestant missionaries in Mauritius
Missionary botanists